Witches is the fifth studio album by Texan band One-Eyed Doll, released on the 12th of March, 2015.
It is a concept album about the Salem Witchcraft Hysteria of 1692.

Track listing

Personnel

Kimberly Freeman Guitar, Banjo, Vocals 
Jason Rufuss Sewell Drums, Bass, Synths, Organ, Mandolin, Backing Vocals, Ember Sermon
Mastered by Eric Broyhill in Sweden

Special Guests: 
Damian Sol Violin 
Alice Giuffreda and Veronica Thorley Witch Hunt Mob Vocals

References 

2015 albums